Edmond Clément (28 March 1867, Paris - 24 February 1928, Nice) was a French lyric tenor who earned an international reputation due to the polished artistry of his singing. During his career he also held a private studio, one of his students being the internationally recognized soprano Marie Sundelius.

Biography
Clément began his studies at the Conservatoire de Paris with Victor Warot, subsequently making his debut at the Opéra-Comique in 1889, as Vincent in Mireille. He was the theater's principle tenor until 1909, appearing in many roles such as Ottavio, Tamino, Almaviva, Georges Brown, Fra Diavolo, Gérald, des Grieux, Werther and Hoffmann, along with many more. Such roles were the bulk of his repertoire and qualified him to be considered between a Lyrischer Tenor and Italienischer tenor.

He was part of the inaugural performance of Le Juif polonais by Camille Erlanger and Hélène by Camille Saint-Saëns, and sang in the Parisian premieres of Falstaff and Madama Butterfly.

When he reached his 40s, his career had begun moving Westward. He was not only popular in Paris and began singing in Brussels, Monte Carlo, Madrid and London, although he never appeared at the Royal Opera House, Covent Garden. He was invited to come to the United States and he quickly joined the stellar roster of singers at the Metropolitan Opera in New York City, where he performed from 1909-1910. He faced competition from the equally popular Italian verismo tenor Enrico Caruso and was quickly overwhelmed, as Clement's more bel canto style was not in high demand at the time. Because of Caruso's growing prestige as a verismo tenor, Clement was not re-signed by the Met's management. While in New York City, he kept his voice in performance shape by taking lessons from the noted pedagogue Frederick Bristol. However, he would find his audience in Boston.

After his time at the MET, from 1911 to 1913 he began singing at the Boston Opera House. Audiences at the theater admired him for his stylish vocalism, exemplary diction and elegant stage presence during his engagements with the Boston Opera Company, thanks in part to his bel canto elegance and dexterous technique. Although his voice was not large, he was considered to be one of the leading Roméos and Don Josés of his era by dint of his musicianship. He was also considered incredibly handsome and possessed developed acting skills for the stage.

Clément returned to his homeland when the First World War erupted in 1914 and was wounded subsequently while serving with the French army. America heard him again during the early 1920s when he travelled across the Atlantic for concert and recital appearances. His last years were spent in semi-retirement in France and are considered his declining period. He gave his last recital in Nice at the age of 60 in 1927. He died on February 24, 1928, in Nice at the age of 61.

Legacy
His voice lives on in the form of recordings which he made in France and the United States for the Odeon, Victor and Pathe companies. These recordings, which have been reissued on CD, consist mainly of operatic arias from his core repertoire. They are helpful in elucidating the vibrant culture of Italian-influenced French, operatic artistry.

Dedications 
In 1911, the French-American composer and conductor H. Maurice Jacquet dedicated his mélodie "Chanson de l'Inconstant" [Song of the inconsistent] to him.

Roles 
Edmond Clement is noted to have sung over 40 roles during his professional career, before retiring at 60 to focus on teaching, as well as perform in smaller concerts and recitals.

Recordings 

 Adieu, for voice and piano by G. Faure (Pathé Records, 1925)
Edmond Clement, An Historical Recording (Delta Records, 1964)
 Edmond Clement: French Opera and Mèlodies; Traditional Chansons (Pearl Records, 1995)
Edmond Clément: The Complete Odéon (1905) and Victor (1911-13) Recordings (Romophone, 1995 and Masterworks)
 Edmond Clement: Edmont Clément: The Most Famous Recordings (Vocal Archives, 1998)
 Edmond Clement: The Complete Pathe Recordings, 1916-1925 (Romophone, 2000)
 Edmond Clement: The Legendary French Tenor, 1911-14 (Minerva Recordings, 2011)

References

Further reading
 Guide de l'opéra, les indispensables de la musique, R. Mancini & J-J. Rouvereux, (Fayard, 1986), 
 The Concise Oxford Dictionary of Opera (Second Edition), Harold Rosenthal and John Warrack, (Oxford University Press, 1980), 
 The Record of Singing, Michael Scott, (Duckworth, 1977)

External links

History of the Tenor - Sound Clips and Narration
Edmond Clément - Pourquoi me réveiller?, retrieved 2021-07-19

1867 births
1928 deaths
Singers from Paris
Conservatoire de Paris alumni
French operatic tenors
19th-century French male opera singers
20th-century French male opera singers
Officiers of the Légion d'honneur